The Confédération Sénégalaise du Scoutisme, the national federation of several Scouting organizations of Senegal, was founded in 1930, and became a member of the World Organization of the Scout Movement in 1963. The coeducational Confédération Sénégalaise du Scoutisme has 9,966 members as of 2011.

The Senegalese Scout Confederation is composed of two associations, Association des Scouts et Guides du Sénégal and the Éclaireuses et Éclaireurs du Sénégal. Both associations are open to boys and girls of any religion. There are sometimes joint leader training courses. Units are mixed at Cub and Rover level only. The units have joint activities in relation to national campaigns including child health projects. 

A satellite office of the Africa Scout Region is located in Dakar.

In 1971, Albert A. N'Diaye was awarded the Bronze Wolf, the only distinction of the World Organization of the Scout Movement, awarded by the World Scout Committee for exceptional services to world Scouting.

Program

Activities
There are many programs relating to youth exchange and international work camps. Many Scout projects throughout the country are implemented in relation to rural development. Community development projects are centered on health, including nutrition and vaccination of children, tree planting, and building and improving schools.

Sections
Jiwu Wi/Cubs- ages 6 to 11
Lawtan Wi/Scouts- ages 12 to 14
Toor-Toor Wi/Senior Scouts-ages 15 to 18
Meneef Mi/Rovers-ages 18 to 35

Ideals
Scout Motto
The Scout Motto is Toujours tout droit, Always Do Right in French.

Scout Promise
Devant tous avec la grâce de Dieu, je m'engage sur mon honneur, à servir de toutes mes forces, Dieu, l'Église et ma patrie, à aider mon prochain en toutes circonstances, à observer la Loi Scoute.

Scout Law
Le Scout dit toujours la vérité, il tient ses promesses
Le Scout est loyal envers son pays, ses parents, ses chefs et ses subordonnés
Le Scout est fait pour servir et sauver son prochain
Le Scout est hospitalier, il est le frère de tous
Le Scout est poli et protége les faibles
Le Scout voit dans la nature l'œuvre de Dieu, il aime les plantes et les animaux
Le Scout sait obéir et ne fait rien à moitié
Le Scout est économe et prend soin du bien d'autrui
Le Scout est maître de soi, il sourit et chante dans ses difficultés
Le Scout est propre, il est pur dans ses pensées, ses paroles et ses actes

References 

World Organization of the Scout Movement member organizations
Scouting and Guiding in Senegal

Youth organizations established in 1930